The Merseyside Nighthawks are an American football team representing the county of Merseyside and based in Skelmersdale, Lancashire, England, who operate in the BAFA National Leagues Premier Division North, the highest level of British American Football. They play out of the JMO Sports Park. Although playing all of their home games in Lancashire, the team train in Liverpool and represent the county of Merseyside. They were formed in 1984 as the Wirral Wolves following a speculative advertisement placed in the Wirral Globe by Paul Tiplady. They played their first game, a friendly against Leigh Razorbacks as part of an America Day in Arrowe Park in the spring of 1985. They played a series of friendly games in 1985, joined the Amateur American Football Conference for 1986 reaching the 'Steel Bowl' Final and the British American Football League in 1987. The Wolves disbanded in early 1988 but former Wolves players went on to form the Birkenhead Nighthawks shortly afterwards before the club were later renamed to represent Merseyside.

History

Formation
Training at the former Ellerman Lines Cricket Ground, in Hoylake, West Wirral, the Wolves used a playing field in Arrowe Park as their matchday base. They amassed a 6–3 record in friendly fixtures, defeating prominent clubs such as the Steel City Giants (38-31), Stoke Spitfires and Sherwood Outlaws. They were formed after founder Paul Tipaldy placed an advert in the Wirral Globe.

The Wirral Wolves joined the AAFC West Division alongside teams from St Helens, Macclesfield and Runcorn. They played their home games at Birkenhead Park RUFC's Upper Park ground, having first faced Leigh Razorbacks and Coventry Bears there during the winter. They won the Western Division with an 8–2 record, losing only to Steel City (home interconference fixture) and St Helens (away), beating eventual champions Scunthorpe Steelers away in an early season matchup. They reached the AAFC Steel Bowl championship game, played on 28 September 1986 they lost 50–32 to the Steelers in the final, with five passing touchdowns by their well renowned passing offense, spearheaded by quarterback Danny Aguado, Wide Receiver Manny Owolabi and Running Back Wayne Freeman.

In the closed season the Wolves management negotiated the use of Tranmere Rovers' Prenton Park Stadium with new Tranmere owner  Peter Johnson who had taken over earlier that year. The preseason was marked by a fixture against an Oregon High School All-Stars team at New Brighton F.C. in which San Diego Chargers' Quarterback Dan Fouts attended as the guest of honour. They regularly attracted paying attendances of 500-1000 for home games at Prenton Park. Having lost at home to Lancashire, they faced the Washington Presidents knowing that only a win would put them back into playoff contention.  This, the most exhilarating game of the 1987 season, was played in front of around 1000 enthusiastic fans at the home of Tranmere Rovers.

Washington had an experienced Quarterback, Tynesider Jeff Rutter, who led the league in TD passes with 39 and averaged over 400 yards a game.   Washington were leading 19–0 at the end of the first quarter, but the Wolves chipped away at the lead and eventually brought the scores level at 54–54 in the fourth quarter. The Wolves then forged ahead 62–60 with a go-ahead touchdown and almost intercepted Rutter to secure the game. Alas the Presidents were able to engineer one final touchdown and ran out 66-62 winners in a game of 19 touchdowns. The Wolves missed the playoffs as a consequence of the loss but have the consolation that the game is recognised in British American Football as one of the best of all time.

Impact of the Wolves
Although tipped for success in 1988 deteriorating relations between coach George Aguado and some Wolves players led to irreconcilable disagreements such that the club was forced to disband. As stated above, several players joined up with former Wolf Gary Lee who had founded the Birkenhead Nighthawks. The Nighthawks merged with Wirral's other club, the Cheshire Cats and went on to have great success at national level in subsequent years. Some remnants of the Wolves organisation were later involved in running the Prestatyn Panthers but this team was no match for the Wolves' long time rivals the Mersey Centurions when they finally met in a league game at Toxteth Sports Centre. As the Wolves and Centurions never played each other the question of which of these two rivals from the opposite sides of the Mersey was the stronger in their heyday in the early days of the sport on Merseyside was never resolved. Despite the loss of the senior team, a Wirral Wolves junior team run by Derek Chapman continued to play throughout the 1988 season and provided players to several local clubs thereafter.

The Wolves are remembered as the first American Football club on the Wirral to take the field (for historical accuracy Gridiron UK magazine listed an earlier club in Wallasey known as the 'Redskin Razorbacks' but this outfit did not attract sufficient members to constitute a viable team). The short life of the club coincided with the first surge in popularity of American Football in the United Kingdom after Channel 4 began screening the game in 1982 and their matches at Tranmere Rovers' Prenton Park attracted relatively large crowds for amateur sport. The Nighthawks were able to keep the flame burning for the sport on the Wirral and in Merseyside and achieved substantial success in later years. This success was displayed as the team was able to go undefeated during the 2014 and 2015 seasons and lead to two bowl victories, both over the Edinburgh Wolves. The 2016 season was the first season in the Premier North for the rejuvenated team since their 2012 Season in which they finished with a 1–9 record, with a victory in the last game of the season over the Coventry Jets. The Nighthawks were able exceed all expectations of those outside of the organisation; culminating in a 7–3 record and a playoff berth for the fourth consecutive season. This season was ended by the current British Champions the London Warriors, in the semi-final of the Premiership.

The Wolves first and only head coach, George Aguado, a Chicago native who coached numerous teams in Northern England and Wales, died in 2005. His passing was marked with a minute's silence at the opening game of the 2005 Challenge Cup between Cardiff Demons and Walney Central at Taff's Well, Wales.

References

American football teams in England
Sport in the Metropolitan Borough of Wirral
Sport in Birkenhead
1984 establishments in England
1988 disestablishments in England
American football teams established in 1984
American football teams disestablished in 1988